Danica Lynn Evans (born June 2, 1995) is an American soccer player who last played as a forward for North Carolina Courage in the NWSL.

Club career

Orlando Pride, 2017–2019
Evans was drafted in the third round (22nd overall) of the 2017 NWSL College Draft by Orlando Pride. She made her first appearance for the club as a substitute against the Portland Thorns in the opening game of the season. One week later, during Orlando Pride's first home game at Orlando City Stadium, Evans came off the bench to score her first professional goal, an 87th-minute equalizer in a 1–1 draw against Washington Spirit. The strike was voted NWSL Goal of the Week.

Evans was waived on January 10, 2020 in order to pursue a playing opportunity in Europe.

Sporting de Huelva, 2020
On January 21, 2020, Evans signed with Spanish Primera División club Sporting de Huelva. She made her debut on January 26 as a 60th minute substitute in a 1–0 defeat to Sevilla. On June 8, 2020, Evans was one of 11 players not retained under contract by the club at the end of the season.

North Carolina Courage, 2020–present
In September 2020, Evans returned to the NWSL to sign with North Carolina Courage through 2020 ahead of the fall series friendlies.

Career statistics

Club

References

External links 

 Orlando Pride profile
 Colorado Buffaloes profile

1995 births
Living people
American women's soccer players
Portland Pilots women's soccer players
Colorado Buffaloes women's soccer players
Orlando Pride draft picks
Orlando Pride players
National Women's Soccer League players
Soccer players from Colorado
Sportspeople from the Denver metropolitan area
People from Lakewood, Colorado
Sportspeople from Littleton, Colorado
Women's association football forwards
Primera División (women) players
Sporting de Huelva players
American expatriate women's soccer players
American expatriate sportspeople in Spain
Expatriate women's footballers in Spain
North Carolina Courage players